El Tiempo, which means "time" or "the time" in Spanish, may refer to:

El Tiempo (Colombia), a Colombian newspaper
El Tiempo (Honduras), a Honduran newspaper
El Tiempo (Ecuador), an Ecuadorian newspaper
El Tiempo (Istanbul), a Turkish newspaper
El Tiempo (Anzoátegui), a Venezuelan newspaper in Anzoátegui state
El Tiempo (Trujillo), a Venezuelan newspaper in Trujillo state
El Tiempo (United States), a Spanish-language U.S. newspaper
El Tiempo (album), a 1994 album by Mexican singer Benny Ibarra

See also
Tiempo (disambiguation)